Oskar Magnus David Kolk (born 9 January 1997) is an English first-class cricketer.

Kolk was born at Guildford in January 1997. He was educated at Reed's School, before going up to Cardiff University. While studying at Cardiff, he made two appearances in first-class cricket for Cardiff MCCU against Somerset and Sussex in 2019. He scored 42 runs in his two matches, with a high score of 33. In addition to playing first-class cricket, Kolk also played minor counties cricket for Wales Minor Counties in 2018–19.

In December 2020, he was selected to play for the Eagles in the 2020–21 Logan Cup in Zimbabwe.

References

External links

1997 births
Living people
People from Guildford
People educated at Reed's School
Alumni of Cardiff University
English cricketers
Wales National County cricketers
Cardiff MCCU cricketers